The SDS Tuberculosis and Rajiv Gandhi Institute of Chest diseases (formerly SDS Tuberculosis Sanatorium) is a government run institute affiliated with Bangalore Medical College and Research Institute specializing in treating tuberculosis and other chest diseases. The sanatorium is housed on a sprawling campus near Hosur road in Bangalore.

SDS Tuberculosis Sanatorium is named after the wife of philanthropist Devarao Shivaram as  Shanthabai Devarao Shivaram Tuberculosis Sanitorium

Later, as it became a teaching hospital associated with the Bangalore Medical College and Research Institute, and under development plans of the Government of Karnataka, it was called Rajiv Gandhi Institute of Chest Diseases. For locals however, it still remains TB aaspatre (Kannada term for hospital).

It is located adjoining the Indira Gandhi Institute of Child Health and the NIMHANS campus.

It a premier institute where chest diseases are treated with expertise from the best in the field. Of special importance attributed to the hospital is its treatment of tuberculosis which is a major cause of mortality and morbidity in the region. Specialised treatment of tuberculosis and its varied complications are dealt with medically and if be need surgically yet being very cost effective. It also functions as a chest injury and trauma care referral hospital.

Undergraduate students in the MBBS and Respiratory therapy, course and post graduate students from the medicine, surgery and allied departments are posted on rotation basis for a definite period for gaining clinical and surgical experience in identifying, treating and following up pulmonary disease.

References

External links
 

Teaching hospitals in India
Hospitals in Bangalore
Tuberculosis sanatoria
Tuberculosis in India
1948 establishments in India